Arek Monthly (أريك in Arabic meaning sun in Armenian) is a monthly magazine published in Cairo, Egypt by Armenian General Benevolent Union (AGBU) in Arabic covering Armenian subjects and concentrating on Arab-Armenian relations. 

The first issue of Arek was in April 2010, one year after the suspension of publication of Arev Monthly in April 2009. The editor-in-chief was Mohammed Refaat el Immam.

See also
 List of magazines in Egypt

References

External links
Archive of Arek Monthly

2010 establishments in Egypt
Arabic-language magazines
Armenian diaspora in Egypt
Armenian General Benevolent Union
Magazines established in 2010
Magazines published in Cairo
Monthly magazines published in Egypt